Martin Čupr (born 17 October 1977) is a Czech former professional footballer who has played as a midfielder for clubs in Czech Republic, Germany and Cyprus.

Club career
Čupr began playing professional football in the Czech Gambrinus liga for FC Slovan Liberec, moving to FK Viktoria Žižkov in 2000. He moved to German Regionalliga side Fortuna Düsseldorf for two seasons, returning to play for Gambrinus liga sides FK Mladá Boleslav, FK Marila Příbram and SK Sigma Olomouc.

International career
Čupr was an unused substitute for the Czech Republic at the 2000 Summer Olympics in Sydney, Australia.

References

External links
 

1977 births
Living people
Sportspeople from Liberec
Czech footballers
Czech Republic youth international footballers
Czech Republic under-21 international footballers
Czech expatriate footballers
Footballers at the 2000 Summer Olympics
Olympic footballers of the Czech Republic
Czech First League players
Cypriot First Division players
FC Slovan Liberec players
FK Viktoria Žižkov players
FK Mladá Boleslav players
1. FK Příbram players
SK Sigma Olomouc players
Fortuna Düsseldorf players
AEP Paphos FC players
Expatriate footballers in Germany
Expatriate footballers in Cyprus
Association football midfielders